"The Coming Anarchy" is an influential article written by journalist Robert D. Kaplan, which was first published in the February 1994 edition of The Atlantic Monthly.  It is considered to be one of the fundamental theses on the state of current world affairs in the post Cold War era, and is ranked on the same level of doctrinal importance as Samuel Huntington's Clash of Civilizations and Francis Fukuyama's The End of History and the Last Man theses. U.S. President Bill Clinton reportedly recommended the article to White House staff. It has also been criticized as a Malthusian reading of the world, for blaming the situation on its victims and for overlooking alleged political and economical causes such as neoliberal policy.

The article 
Whilst Fukuyama believed that the end of the Cold War would bring about a new era of peace in world affairs, Kaplan argued that the Cold War was the closest the world would ever get to Utopia.  The new struggles were no longer neatly ideological, but cultural and historical. Kaplan saw the disorder and civil strife he observed in West Africa as representative of broader global trends. As environmental stress worsened, bringing with it widespread disease and resource conflict, rural population groups will migrate more to urban areas causing an increase of social disharmony. A shift in artificial political borders, from states to cities, will redefine identities along cultural or tribal lines. Politics would become localized as states’ powers fade, with sub-national conflicts about self-defense, not ideology, becoming commonplace. The post-modern world would be, for Kaplan, one of numerous cross-cutting identities, systems and allegiances, far from the ordered state-based system that Kaplan saw in the West at the time. He follows the argument of Thomas Homer-Dixon in which he suggests that politics should be more linked to the physical world again and should focus on combatting the causes of problems rather than combatting the consequences. To do so we should start with redefining the worldmap and give more agency to existing borderlines rather than drawing them ourselves. Cartography should be made in three dimensions in which group and other identities are atop the merely two-dimension color markings of city-states and the remaining nations. Agency of many smaller groups should be included and instead of using borders, maps should be constantly evolving in moving 'centers' of power. The last map, as he calls it, should be an ever-mutating representation of chaos.

20 years later 
20 years after the original publication of the original article, Robert D. Kaplan published a follow up article, entitled Why So Much Anarchy? (2016), reflecting on the original's article relevance on current events, especially in Arab countries. In this new article, Kaplan recognizes that some of his prophecies, such as a revival of racial violence in America, did not come to be. However, he also stands by some of his more provocative arguments, such as the belief that "Islam is a religion ideally suited for the urbanizing poor who were willing to fight [emphasis added]". He thus mentions the growing popularity of Turkish President Erdogan's conservative Justice and Development Party, largely seen as aligning itself with Islamic tendencies, as fulfilling his prediction of the rise of political Islam in Turkey. He also advances further arguments to determine which regimes are bound to fail, notably the presence of a strong, robust bureaucracy, which in turn necessitates a well entrenched middle class. Thus, the arguably successful democratic transition of most former Soviet republics into stable democracies can be explained by a strong bureaucratic apparatus backed by an important middle class. The lack of "bourgeoise traditions", on the other hand, can be interpreted as one of the main reasons of the failure of states such as Sierra Leone. Overall, Kaplan sticks to his original narrative, forecasting an inevitable anarchy on vast portions of the world.

In 2018, he revisited the article again for The National Interest in an article called "The Anarchy That Came". It concludes with the statement, "My vision—then and now—of vast geopolitical disruption is not ultimately pessimistic, but merely historical."

The book 

The article was republished as the first chapter of the book The Coming Anarchy in 2000. The book also included the controversial article Was Democracy Just A Moment?, first published in The Atlantic in December 1997, and several others by Kaplan.

See also 
 Cultural evolution
 Democratic peace theory
 War to end all wars
 World peace

References

External links
The Coming Anarchy

The Atlantic (magazine) articles
Cold War
Books about civilizations
1994 works